Mira Dobreva (Bulgarian: Мира Добрева) (born August 12, 1972, in Zlatograd) is a Bulgarian TV news presenter recently working on Bulgarian National Television.  She was the Bulgarian spokesperson for the Eurovision Song Contest 2007.

In 2009, she appeared in the first season of VIP Dance, the Bulgarian version of Strictly Come Dancing.

Her second marriage is to Bulgarian TV producer Joro Tornev.

References

Dobrova, Mira
Living people
1972 births
People from Zlatograd